OJE or oje can refer to

 Öje, a village in Malung municipality, Dalarna, Sweden
 Ojé, an antihelminthic folk remedy made from Ficus insipida latex
 Organización Juvenil Española, Spanish Youth Organization, volunteer movement that originated in 1960, founded by Spanish youths for the training of Youth, with a philosophy and own ideas and specific teaching techniques